ESafe Protect, previously known as Eliashim Antivirus, is a line of software security products. It was developed by EliaShim Ltd., based in Haifa, Israel, and distributed by eSafe Technologies Inc., of Seattle, United States.

The program
EliaShim was acquired by Aladdin Knowledge Systems in December 1998. eSafe Protect (the consumer desktop version) was distributed by Aladdin Knowledge Systems until it was later discontinued in 2002.

In the following years, the eSafe brand evolved into a gateway-based, fully featured content security product which was sold by Aladdin Knowledge Systems, as an integrated security appliance.

In March 2009, Aladdin Knowledge Systems merged eSafe Protect with SafeNet Inc., and eSafe evolved to become the SafeNet eSafe Content Security product line.

References

Sources

SafeNet Website

Antivirus software
Information technology companies of Israel
Computer security companies
Computer security software companies
Companies based in Haifa